Mame Younousse Dieng (1939 – 1 April 2016) was a Senegalese writer born in Tivaouane who lived in Dakar. Her novel Aawo bi is noteworthy as one of the first Senegalese novels in the Wolof language. She also wrote poetry and translated the national anthem into that language.

Books
 Aawo bi (The First Wife), 1992 - in Wolof
 L'Ombre en feu (The Shadow on Fire), Nouvelles Editions Africaines du Sénégal (1997),  - in French

Further reading
 Simon Gikandi, Encyclopedia of African Literature, Routledge (2002),  - p. 145

References

External links
University of Western Australia

1939 births
2016 deaths
Senegalese novelists
Senegalese poets
Senegalese women poets
Senegalese women novelists